Kharatyan is an Armenian surname that may refer to
Dmitry Kharatyan (born 1960), Russian actor of Armenian descent
Hranush Kharatyan (born 1952), Armenian ethnographer
Rudolf Kharatyan (born 1947), Armenian ballet dancer, choreographer and painter

Armenian-language surnames